Uksunay is a rural locality (a selo) in Starotogulsky Selsoviet, Togulsky District, Altai Krai, Russia. The population was 99 as of 2013. There are 8 streets.

Geography 
Uksunay is located on the Uksunay River, 15 km northeast of Togul (the district's administrative centre) by road. Lnozavod is the nearest rural locality.

References 

Rural localities in Togulsky District